Edwards Run is a tributary of the Beaver River in western Pennsylvania.  The stream rises in western Lawrence County and flows east entering the Beaver River at Moravia, Pennsylvania. The watershed is roughly 60% agricultural, 33% forested and the rest is other uses.

References

Rivers of Pennsylvania
Tributaries of the Beaver River
Rivers of Lawrence County, Pennsylvania